Oh Sang-eun (born April 13, 1977, in Daegu, South Korea) is a South Korean table tennis player. He is currently sponsored by the table tennis product company, Butterfly.
His World Ranking had been in the top 10 since the 2005 World Championships in Shanghai until April 2008. His highest ranking was number 5 in May 2007.

Career records
Singles (as of December 26, 2010)
 Olympics: QF (2008).
 World Championships: SF (2005).
 World Cup appearances: 5. Record: 4th (2009).
 Pro Tour winner (7): Korea, Chile, USA Open 2005; Chinese Taipei Open 2006; Korea Open 2007; Japan Open 2009; Brazil Open 2012. Runner-up (2): USA Open 1996; Japan Open 2003.
 Pro Tour Grand Finals appearances: 6. Record: runner-up (2006); SF (2005).
 Asian Games: SF (1998, 2002).
 Asian Championships: SF (2007).

Men's doubles
 Olympics: QF (2000).
 World Championships: SF (2001, 03).
 Pro Tour winner (10): USA Open 1997; Danish Open 2001; Korea Open 2002; Chile, USA, German, Swedish Open 2005; Korea Open 2007; Polish Open 2009; Brazil Open 2012. Runner-up (9): USA Open 1996; China Open 1999; Qatar, Japan Open 2001; Qatar, USA, Danish Open 2002; Croatian Open 2003; Japan Open 2009.
 Pro Tour Grand Finals appearances: 3. Record: winner (2001); runner-up (2000, 05).
 Asian Games: runner-up (1998, 2002).
 Asian Championships: runner-up (1998); SF (1994, 2005).

Mixed doubles
 World Championships: runner-up (2001).
 Asian Games: runner-up (1998).
 Asian Championships: winner (2007); SF (1996, 98).

Team
 Olympics: 2nd (2012); 3rd (2008).
 World Championships: 2nd (2006); 3rd (1997, 2001, 04, 10).
 World Team Cup: 2nd (2009, 10); 3rd (2007).
 Asian Games: 2nd (1998, 2002, 06, 10).
 Asian Championships: 1st (1996); 2nd (1994, 98, 2005).

References

External links 
 
 
 
 
 

1977 births
Living people
Olympic bronze medalists for South Korea
Olympic table tennis players of South Korea
South Korean male table tennis players
Table tennis players at the 2000 Summer Olympics
Table tennis players at the 2004 Summer Olympics
Table tennis players at the 2008 Summer Olympics
Table tennis players at the 2012 Summer Olympics
Olympic medalists in table tennis
Asian Games medalists in table tennis
Sportspeople from Daegu
Olympic silver medalists for South Korea
Medalists at the 2012 Summer Olympics
Medalists at the 2008 Summer Olympics
Table tennis players at the 1998 Asian Games
Table tennis players at the 2002 Asian Games
Table tennis players at the 2006 Asian Games
Table tennis players at the 2010 Asian Games
Medalists at the 1998 Asian Games
Medalists at the 2002 Asian Games
Medalists at the 2006 Asian Games
Medalists at the 2010 Asian Games
Asian Games silver medalists for South Korea
Asian Games bronze medalists for South Korea
World Table Tennis Championships medalists
South Korean expatriate sportspeople in China
Seoul National University of Science and Technology alumni